Tullaghan is a townland in County Westmeath, Ireland.

Tullaghan is one of 64 townlands of the civil parish of Mullingar in the barony of Moyashel and Magheradernon in the Province of Leinster. The neighbouring townlands are: Farranistick to the north–east, Irishtown to the south–east, Walshestown South and Part of Walshestown North to the south, Walshestown North to the south–west and Ballard to the north–west.

In the 1911 census of Ireland there were 2 houses and 8 inhabitants in the townland.

References

External links
Map of Tullaghan at openstreetmap.org
Tullaghan at The IreAtlas Townland Data Base
Tullaghan at Townlands.ie
Tullaghan at the Placenames Database of Ireland

Townlands of County Westmeath